"Thank God It's Christmas" is a Christmas single by the British rock band Queen. It was written by lead guitarist Brian May and drummer Roger Taylor. Released on 26 November 1984, the single spent six weeks in the UK charts over Christmas 1984 and new year of 1985, and peaked at number 21.

The song was not originally released on any Queen studio album, appearing only on Queen's Greatest Hits III, released in 1999, and as the B-side of the single "A Winter's Tale" from the 1995 album Made in Heaven. However, the track was finally included on the bonus EP packaged with the deluxe edition of their album The Works, remastered and re-released in 2011.

It appears on the Christmas compilation LP The Edge of Christmas in its full 12" version with the drum intro. It also appears on the US-only compilation boxed-set The Queen Collection, which consisted of a re-release of the LPs Classic Queen and Queen's Greatest Hits along with a bonus CD called Queen Talks that included this song, along with a 1989 interview with the band.

Music video

Upon its original release, no promotional video was filmed for the track, with shows often using footage of live performances in lieu of an official promotional music video. In a 2018 interview with Ultimate Classic Rock, Brian May blamed the lack of a music video for the single's underwhelming chart performance

In 2019, an animated version of the music video was produced. The animation, directed by Justin Moon and Drew Gleason, depicted a wintery evening scene, with people enjoying each other's company during the Christmas season. 
The video was released in December 2019 on the Queen Official YouTube channel.

Track listings

7" single

12" single

Personnel

Freddie Mercury – lead and backing vocals
Brian May – electric guitar, synthesiser, backing vocals
Roger Taylor – drums, drum machine, sleigh bells, synthesiser, backing vocals
John Deacon – bass guitar

Chart performance

Certifications

References

External links
 Lyrics at Queen official website (from Greatest Hits III)

Queen (band) songs
1984 singles
British Christmas songs
Rock ballads
Songs written by Roger Taylor (Queen drummer)
Songs written by Brian May
Hollywood Records singles
EMI Records singles
Capitol Records singles
1984 songs
Song recordings produced by Reinhold Mack